Mikhaēl I may refer to:

 Michael I Rhangabes, Byzantine Emperor (ruled 811–813)
 Michael I Cerularius (c. 1000–1059), Patriarch of Constantinople
 Michael I Komnenos Doukas (died in 1215)